141 R 1199 is a preserved French steam locomotive of the SNCF Class 141Rs. The locomotive is classified as a Monument historique since 1984.

History

Locomotive 1199 was built at the Baldwin Locomotive Works factory in Philadelphia, Pennsylvania as part of the rebuilding of the French rail network due to damage caused during the Second World War. Arriving in France (via the Port of Cherbourg), the unit was assigned to the depot at Le Mans. It worked out of Le Mans from July 17, 1947 until August 25, 1971, when it was retired after having travelled 1 627 474 km. It was one of the few locomotives of the 141R type that worked out of the same depot over its service life.

In 1975, the locomotive was chosen to be donated to the San Diego Railroad Museum. The donation did not proceed and the unit was stored at Vitré station, under the supervision of the Association Rail 35. 1199 was then classified as a Monument historique on December 6, 1984. 1199 was moved in 1994  to Nantes-Blottereau station for restoration work by the Association Loco Vapeur 1199 (Steam Locomotive 1199 Association) (created in 1993) with work starting under an agreement signed that same year. Restoration lasted twelve years. 141 R 1199 was returned to the rails in 2004, making trips to the western part of the country. 1199 was pulled from service in 2011 for a boiler overhaul  at a cost of 191 000 Euros with support of the Fondation du patrimoine.

The locomotive is well-known in France and has been visited by thousands during heritage events in the country.

References

 
2-8-2 locomotives
141.R
Baldwin locomotives
Steam locomotives of France
Railway locomotives introduced in 1945
Standard gauge locomotives of France